Dorsa Geikie is a wrinkle ridge at  in Mare Fecunditatis on the Moon. It is approximately 220 km long and was named after Scottish geologist Sir Archibald Geikie in 1976 by the IAU.

References

External links
 LAC-80 Lunar Chart

Ridges on the Moon
Mare Fecunditatis